Brachystomia is a genus of sea snails, marine gastropod mollusks in the family Pyramidellidae, the pyrams and their allies.

Species
Species within the genus Brachystomia include:
 Brachystomia angusta (Jeffreys, 1867)
 Brachystomia bipyramidata (Nomura, 1936)
 Brachystomia carrozzai (van Aartsen, 1987)
 Brachystomia eulimoides (Hanley, 1844)
 Brachystomia minutiovum (Nomura, 1936)
 Brachystomia miyagiana (Nomura, 1936)
 Brachystomia omaensis (Nomura, 1938)
 Brachystomia perplexissima (Nomura, 1937)
 Brachystomia scalaris'''' (MacGillivray, 1843) Brachystomia tenerissima (Nomura, 1937)
Species brought into synonymy
 Brachystomia electa (Jeffreys, 1883): synonym of Brachystomia eulimoides (Hanley, 1844)
 Brachystomia lukisi (Jeffreys, 1859): synonym of Odostomia lukisii Jeffreys, 1859

Description

References

 Monterosato T. A. (di) (1884). Nomenclatura generica e specifica di alcune conchiglie mediterranee. Palermo, Virzi, 152 pp

External links
 To World Register of Marine Species

Pyramidellidae